The Caribou Mother is an Inuit deity who represents the source of caribou, a vital food source for the Inuit. She is seen as gigantic, with people and caribou as lice on her enormous body. The Caribou mother is known as one of the oldest Inuit deities.

References 

Inuit goddesses
Inuit mythology
Animal goddesses
Mythological deer